Gilvan Ribeiro (born 8 May 1989) is a Brazilian canoeist. He competed in the men's K-2 200 metres event at the 2016 Summer Olympics.

References

External links
 
 

1989 births
Living people
Brazilian male canoeists
Olympic canoeists of Brazil
Canoeists at the 2016 Summer Olympics
Place of birth missing (living people)
Pan American Games medalists in canoeing
Pan American Games bronze medalists for Brazil
Canoeists at the 2015 Pan American Games
South American Games gold medalists for Brazil
South American Games medalists in canoeing
Competitors at the 2010 South American Games
Medalists at the 2015 Pan American Games
21st-century Brazilian people